Vollrath is both a masculine German given name and a surname. It may refer to:

Calvin Vollrath (born 1960), Canadian fiddler and composer
Jacob Vollrath (1824–1898), American businessman
Patrick Vollrath, German filmmaker
Vollrath von Hellermann (1900–1971), German military officer
Vollrath Lübbe (1894–1969), German military officer
Vollrath Tham (1913–1995), Swedish military officer
Frederick E. Vollrath (1940–2017), United States Army general

German masculine given names